Sympathy for Mr. Vengeance (lit. "Vengeance Is Mine") is a 2002 South Korean thriller film directed and co-written by Park Chan-wook. The film stars Shin Ha-kyun as Ryu, a young, deaf-mute factory worker trying to earn enough money for his sister's kidney transplant by holding the daughter of a wealthy man for ransom, and the path of vengeance that follows when the plan goes awry. Alongside Ha-kyun, the film's cast includes Song Kang-ho, Bae Doona, Han Bo-bae, and Im Ji-eun.

Sympathy for Mr. Vengeance did not fare well commercially upon its initial release in South Korea, and has garnered mixed reviews. Despite this, it won several awards. It is the first installment in director Park's thematic Vengeance Trilogy, and is followed by Oldboy (2003) and Lady Vengeance (2005).

Plot
Ryu is a deaf-mute man who works in a factory. His ailing sister is in desperate need of a kidney transplant, but Ryu's is not a match. After he loses his job, Ryu contacts a group of black market organ dealers to exchange one of his kidneys for one that his sister can use. However, the dealers disappear after taking Ryu's kidney and severance money. A legitimate kidney donor is found, but after having been conned by the organ dealers, Ryu is unable to afford the operation. To raise money, Yeong-mi, Ryu's radical anarchist girlfriend, suggests kidnapping the daughter of the executive that fired Ryu. They observe the executive with company president Park Dong-jin arriving at the latter's home one day, where one of Dong-jin's employees, Peng, attempts to commit harakiri in front of them. Ryu and Yeong-mi change their plan, deciding to kidnap Dong-jin's young daughter Yu-sun.

Yu-sun stays with Ryu's sister, who believes that Ryu is babysitting her. Ryu and Yeong-mi send a request for ransom to Dong-jin, and he obliges. Upon returning home with the ransom money, Ryu discovers that his sister learned that Yu-sun was kidnapped and not wanting to be a burden any longer, has committed suicide. Ryu takes Yu-sun and his sister's body to a riverbed they frequented as children to bury her. Distracted by the burial and unable to hear, Ryu is unaware when Yu-sun slips into the river, and she drowns. After Yu-sun's body is discovered by authorities, a deeply mournful Dong-jin hires an investigator to find her kidnappers. Dong-jin finds Ryu's sister's corpse by the riverbed, where he interacts with a mentally disabled man who witnessed Ryu burying his sister, and begins to piece together the identities of Ryu and Yeong-mi.

Ryu, armed with a baseball bat, locates the organ traffickers and murders them, receiving a stab wound in the process. Meanwhile, Dong-jin finds Yeong-mi and tortures her with electricity, also killing a deliveryman who comes to her apartment. She apologizes for Yu-sun's death but warns Dong-jin that her terrorist friends will kill him if she dies. Unfazed, Dong-jin electrocutes her. Ryu returns to Yeong-mi's apartment and sees the police removing her corpse. Dong-jin knocks Ryu unconscious with a booby trap. He takes Ryu to the riverbed where his daughter died and drags him into the water. Dong-jin slashes Ryu's achilles tendons and waits for him to drown. After Dong-jin dismembers Ryu's corpse, Yeong-mi's anarchist associates arrive and stab Dong-jin, where they pin a note to his chest with a knife, and leave him to die.

Cast
 Song Kang-ho as Park Dong-jin, Yu-sun's father and the president of a manufacturing company who is a friend of Ryu's employers
 Shin Ha-kyun as Ryu, a deaf-mute factory worker trying to pay his sister's hospital bills
 Bae Doona as Cha Yeong-mi, Ryu's girlfriend of several years
 Han Bo-bae as Yu-sun, Dong-jin's young daughter
 Im Ji-eun as Ryu's sister, who is in need of a kidney transplant
 Lee Dae-yeon as Choi, the investigator hired by Dong-jin 
 Ryoo Seung-bum as a mentally disabled person at the lake
 Ryoo Seung-wan as a food delivery person at Cha's apartment
 Oh Kwang-rok as an anarchist
 Lee Kan-hee as Park Dong-jin's ex-wife
 Jung Jae-young as the husband of Dong-jin's ex-wife

Reception

Box office
The film received a low-profile North American theatrical release from Tartan Films beginning August 19, 2005, over three years after it debuted in South Korea. In its opening weekend, it collected  ( per screen) from three New York City theaters.

Critical response
On the review aggregator website Rotten Tomatoes, the film has an approval rating of 54% based on 56 reviews, with an average rating of 6.16/10. The website's critical consensus reads: "Though Park directs with stylistic flair, this revenge thriller is more excessively gruesome than thrilling." On Metacritic, the film has a weighted average score of 56/100 based on 21 reviews, indicating "mixed or average reviews".

G. Allen Johnson of the San Francisco Chronicle called the film "a waste", referring to it as "so bloody, scatologically violent and consistently shocking, [that] it seems to have no larger purpose than itself – which is pretty grim." Manohla Dargis of The New York Times wrote that "it is a drag that the film never rises to the level of its director's obvious ability", stating that "the violence [in the film] carries no meaning beyond the creator's ego." Daniel Eagan of Film Journal International called the film "glossy, morbid and childishly provocative", praising its visual style but criticizing director Park's "curdled vision". Michael Phillips of the Chicago Tribune wrote: "[It] is a rigorously planned film. It's also a disingenuous one, somber in tone, callow at its core."

Derek Elley of Variety called the film "a gripping psychodrama, marbled with blackly ironic humor". The Guardians Peter Bradshaw gave the film a score of three out of five stars, calling it "deeply twisted and bizarre" but noting its "weirdly nightmarish conviction." Wesley Morris of The Boston Globe gave the film a positive review, calling it "a pristine-looking movie with astounding framing and a deftly handled sociopolitical bent", and concluding that, "despite the coldblooded killing and trail of the dead, Mr. Vengeance feels warmly suffused with life." In her review of the film for The A.V. Club, Tasha Robinson wrote that Park's "style is as bold and uncompromising as his story, which seems designed to show how revenge dehumanizes more than it satisfies, even for people who wholly deserve revenge. [...] It's a difficult balancing act, but Park crafts his layers carefully and masterfully."

Awards
2002 Busan Film Critics Awards
 Best Film
 Best Director – Park Chan-wook

2002 Chunsa Film Art Awards
 Best Music – Baik Hyun-jhin and Jang Young-gyu (UhUhBoo Project)

2002 Korean Association of Film Critics Awards
 Best Director – Park Chan-wook
 Best Screenplay – Park Chan-wook, Lee Jae-soon, Lee Moo-young and Lee Yong-jong

2002 Korean Film Awards
 Best Cinematography – Kim Byung-il
 Best Editing – Kim Sang-bum
 Best Lighting – Park Hyun-won

2002 Director's Cut Awards
 Best Director – Park Chan-wook

Remake
In January 2010, Warner Bros. acquired the rights for an American remake of the film. Brian Tucker was attached to write the screenplay, to be produced by Lorenzo di Bonaventura and Mark Vahradian, in a team-up with CJ Entertainment.

See also
 List of films featuring the deaf and hard of hearing

References

External links
 
 
 
 
 Review at Koreanfilm.org

2002 films
2000s crime thriller films
2002 action thriller films
2000s thriller drama films
South Korean action thriller films
2002 drama films
South Korean crime thriller films
South Korean neo-noir films
Films directed by Park Chan-wook
Korean Sign Language films
2000s Korean-language films
South Korean films about revenge
2000s South Korean films